The Great Divide Trail (GDT) is a wilderness hiking trail in the Canadian Rockies. The trail closely follows the Great Divide between Alberta and British Columbia, crossing the divide more than 30 times. Its southern terminus is in Waterton Lakes National Park at the Canada–US border (where it connects with the Continental Divide Trail) and its northern terminus is at Kakwa Lake in Kakwa Provincial Park, north of Jasper National Park.

History
The first record of the Great Divide Trail appears in 1966 when the Girl Guides of Canada proposed the idea of a trail running the length of the BC–Alberta border through the Rocky Mountains. In 1970, Jim Thorsell developed the first-ever GDT guide: the "Provisional Trail Guide and Map for the Proposed Great Divide Trail" and the national park service approved the project with the objective of completing the GDT by 1975. However, five years later Parks Canada stalled its planning process altogether, citing inadequate trail planning methodology and unresolved overuse issues.

Outside of the National Parks, the route south of Palliser Pass was originally mapped in 1974 by six University of Calgary students with support from the Alberta Wilderness Association and the Federal Opportunities for Youth Program. Mary Jane Cox, Jenny Feick, Chris Hart, Dave Higgins, Cliff White, and Dave Zevick surveyed an estimated  along the proposed GDT route outside of the National Parks. Cliff White was the project coordinator and used the data from the project as the basis of an undergraduate thesis. They founded the Great Divide Trail Association and began trail construction in the summer of 1976. But by the mid-1980s, long after Parks Canada had abandoned the idea, provincial support waned, the Great Divide Trail Association faded from existence and the concept of the GDT nearly disappeared.

In 2000, Dustin Lynx breathed new life in to the GDT by releasing his guidebook "Hiking Canada's Great Divide Trail". By 2004, a group known as the Friends of the Great Divide Trail began to work on the GDT once again, dedicated to maintaining the original section of the GDT running through unprotected Alberta Crown Forest Reserve lands, from North Fork Pass to Fording River Pass, that was constructed in the 1970s and 80s. In 2013, the Friends of the Great Divide Trail re-activated the Great Divide Trail Association, a Canadian not-for-profit corporation headquartered in Calgary, Alberta, dedicated to maintaining and protecting the GDT. Since then, the volunteer-run GDTA has been active in conducting maintenance and trail building throughout the length of the Great Divide Trail. Most notably, the GDTA is constructing the 50 km High Rock Trail section, which replaces old roads to better link the town of Coleman with the 100 km original section of the GDT built in the 80's.

Route

While the Great Divide Trail is a recognized hiking trail, only portions of it are officially recognized by Parks Canada and therefore is often not signed and occasionally not even an actual trail - merely a wilderness route. At present, the Great Divide Trail is about 80% singletrack, 10% wilderness route and 10% old roads and ATV trails.

The GDT passes through five National Parks: Waterton Lakes, Banff, Kootenay, Yoho and Jasper; nine Provincial Parks: Akamina-Kishinena, Castle, Castle Wildland, Elk Lakes, Peter Lougheed, Height of the Rockies, Mount Assiniboine, Mount Robson and Kakwa; four wilderness areas: Beehive Natural Area, Kananaskis Country, White Goat Wilderness Area and Willmore Wilderness Area; and four forest districts: Bow/Crow, Cranbrook, Golden and Robson Valley.

The Great Divide is the major hydrological divide of North America. Along the GDT, the Great Divide separates water flowing into the Pacific Ocean to the west (via the Columbia River) from Hudson Bay (via the North Saskatchewan River) and the Arctic Ocean (via the Athabasca River) to the east.

References

External links
 Great Divide Trail Association
 List of backpacking and hiking journals of the GDT

Banff National Park
Canadian Rockies
Great Divide of North America
Hiking trails in Alberta
Hiking trails in British Columbia
Jasper National Park
Kootenay National Park
Waterton Lakes National Park
Yoho National Park